Bruinsma is a surname of West Frisian origin. It originated as a patronymic surname, "son of Bruin" (Bruno).   Notable people with this surname include:

Evan Bruinsma (born 1992), American basketball player
Klaas Bruinsma (drug lord) (1953-1991), Dutch drug dealer
Klaas Bruinsma (translator) (born 1931), West Frisian translator
Liesette Bruinsma (born 2000), Dutch Paralympic swimmer
Robijn Bruinsma (born 1953), Dutch theoretical physicist
Sikke Bruinsma (1889–1963), Dutch sports shooter
Dylan Bruinsma (Born 2005), Basketball player, 2022 State Champion

References

Surnames of Frisian origin
Patronymic surnames